The 2016–17 Korvpalli Meistriliiga season (also known as the Alexela Korvpalli Meistriliiga for sponsorship reasons) was the 92nd season of top-tier basketball in Estonia. Kalev/Cramo came into the season as defending champions of the 2015–16 season.

The season began on 2 October 2016 and concluded on 22 May 2017 with Kalev/Cramo defeating AVIS UTILITAS Rapla 4 games to 0 in the finals to win their 9th Estonian Championship.

Teams

Venues and locations

Personnel and sponsorship

Coaching changes

Regular season
During the regular season teams will play 4 rounds for 32 games (2 at home and 2 away) with following exceptions:

University of Tartu will play 1 round at home against teams other than Kalev/Cramo (1 round at home and 2 rounds away in total).
Kalev/Cramo will play 2 rounds away against teams other than University of Tartu (2 rounds away in total).
G4S Noorteliiga will play 2 rounds (1 round at home and 1 round away in total).

Double points will be awarded to teams winning those games.

League table
{| class="wikitable" style="text-align: center;"
! width=20| !! width=200|Team !! width=30| !! width=30| !! width=30|  !! width=30| !! width=30| !!width=200| Qualification
|- bgcolor=#CCFFCC
|1||align=left|Kalev/Cramo||32||29||3||61|| 
| rowspan=8 align="center"|Qualification to Playoffs
|- bgcolor=#CCFFCC
|2||align=left|University of Tartu||32||29||3||61|| 
|- bgcolor=#CCFFCC
|3||align=left|AVIS UTILITAS Rapla||32||20||12||52|| 
|- bgcolor=#CCFFCC
|4||align=left|Port of Pärnu||32||17||15||49|| 
|- bgcolor=#CCFFCC
|5||align=left|TTÜ||32||16||16||48|| 
|- bgcolor=#CCFFCC
|6||align=left|Valga-Valka/Maks & Moorits||32||12||20||44|| 
|- bgcolor=#CCFFCC
|7||align=left|TLÜ/Kalev||32||12||20||44|| 
|- bgcolor=#CCFFCC
|8||align=left|Rakvere Tarvas/Palmse Metall||32||9||23||41|| 
|-
|9||align=left|G4S Noorteliiga||32||0||32||32|| 
|

Results

Playoffs

The playoffs began on 10 April and ended on 22 May. The tournament concluded with Kalev/Cramo defeating AVIS UTILITAS Rapla 4 games to 0 in the finals.

Bracket

Individual statistics
Players qualify to this category by having at least 50% games played.

Points

Rebounds

Assists

All-Star Game
The 2017 All-Star Game was played on 16 February 2017 in Tallinn at the Saku Suurhall. Team Blue won the game 159–152 (139–136). The MVP of the game was Rain Veideman, who scored 37 points.

Awards

Most Valuable Player
 Thomas van der Mars (AVIS UTILITAS Rapla)

Finals Most Valuable Player
 Branko Mirković (Kalev/Cramo)

Best Defender
 Mihkel Kirves (Port of Pärnu)

Best Young Player
 Siim-Markus Post (Rakvere Tarvas/Palmse Metall)

Coach of the Year
 Aivar Kuusmaa (AVIS UTILITAS Rapla)

All-KML Team

Player of the Month

See also

 2016–17 Basketball Champions League
 2016–17 FIBA Europe Cup
 2016–17 VTB United League
 2016–17 Baltic Basketball League
 2016–17 Latvian Basketball League

References

External links
Official website 

Korvpalli Meistriliiga seasons
Estonian
KML